Super Bubble Pop is a puzzle video game released in 2002 by Runecraft.

Gameplay
The Player is able to choose from 5 DJ poppers, including 2 unlockable ones, along with 4 grooving soundtracks. They are faced with rows of advancing bubbles of different colors. They can launch bubbles of their own. The idea is to create a row, column or stack of 3 or more bubbles. When that happens, they will pop. Each character has their own favorite bubble color and when they pop them, color energy is transferred to their special jar. Once the jar is full, the player can unleash their super special attack. During the puzzles, the player is also provided with nine different special attacks that they can obtain by getting special bubbles. The current special attack the player has is displayed on a wheel called the Torus.

The game consists of 3 different 1 player difficulty modes along with a training mode, each having 50 levels of bubble popping puzzles and a 2 player mode that allows a player to compete for the higher score against a friend. Each level is allowed to be won by popping all of the bubbles or by collecting a certain amount of Level Stars.

References

External links
Original Super Bubble Pop website – courtesy of the Internet Archive.

2002 video games
EGames (video game developer) games
Game Boy Advance games
GameCube games
Jaleco games
LithTech games
Multiplayer and single-player video games
PlayStation (console) games
Puzzle video games
Video games developed in the United Kingdom
Video games developed in the United States
Windows games
Xbox games